Rue de l'Estrapade is a 1953 French film.

References

External links
Rue de l'Estrapade at IMDb 
Rue de l'Estrapade at louisjourdan.net 
Rue de l'Estrapade at Monsieur.louisjourdan.net

1953 films
French black-and-white films
1950s French films